Iryna Chykhradze-Khariv (born 1989) is a freestyle wrestler from Ukraine. She won the bronze medal the 2014 World Wrestling Championships. She is of Georgian descent.

In 2021, she won one of the bronze medals in her event at the 2021 Poland Open held in Warsaw, Poland.

References

External links
 

1989 births
Living people
Ukrainian female sport wrestlers
World Wrestling Championships medalists
Wrestlers at the 2019 European Games
European Games competitors for Ukraine
European Wrestling Championships medalists
21st-century Ukrainian women